Robert Kenneth Campbell (born 1938) is a former American football player who played with the New York Titans. He played college football at West Chester University. He is the father of Scott Campbell, who was also a football player. Campbell also served as athletic director and a coach at Hershey High School.

References

1938 births
Living people
American football ends
West Chester Golden Rams football players
New York Titans (AFL) players